Sir Anthony Michael Coll (1861–1931) was Chief Justice of Jamaica from 1910 to 1922 when he retired from public life.

References 

Chief justices of Jamaica
Knights Bachelor
1861 births
1931 deaths
20th-century Jamaican judges